Haashim Domingo (born 13 August 1995) is a South African soccer player who plays for Mamelodi Sundowns.

Club career
He made his professional debut in the Segunda Liga for Vitória Guimarães B on 14 February 2015 in a game against Atlético CP and scored a goal on his debut.

He signed for South African Premier Division side Mamelodi Sundowns on a five-year deal in September 2020.

References

1995 births
Living people
Soccer players from Cape Town
South African soccer players
Vitória S.C. B players
Pevidém S.C. players
South African expatriate soccer players
Expatriate footballers in Portugal
South African expatriate sportspeople in Portugal
Expatriate footballers in Norway
South African expatriate sportspeople in Norway
Liga Portugal 2 players
Raufoss IL players
Norwegian First Division players
Association football midfielders
Bidvest Wits F.C. players
Mamelodi Sundowns F.C. players
South African Premier Division players